Ralph Staub (July 21, 1899 in Chicago, Illinois – October 22, 1969, Los Angeles, California) was a movie director, writer and producer.

Three of his short subjects in the Screen Snapshots series have been nominated for the Academy Award and he was awarded a star on the Hollywood Walk of Fame at 1752 Vine Street in Hollywood, California, USA.

Partial filmography
 As Director
 What, No Men! (1934)
 Art Trouble (1934) short; film debut of James Stewart
 Keystone Hotel (1935)
 Carnival Day (1936)
 Sitting on the Moon (1936)
 Country Gentlemen (1936)
 The Mandarin Mystery (1936)
 Join the Marines (1937)
 Navy Blues (1937)
 Affairs of Cappy Ricks (1937)
 Meet the Boyfriend (1937)
 Mama Runs Wild (1937)
 Prairie Moon (1938)
 Western Jamboree (1938)
 Swing Hotel (1939)
 Chip of the Flying U (1939)
 Yukon Flight (1940)
 Danger Ahead (1940)
 Sky Bandits (1940)
 Hollywood in Uniform (1943)

External links

References

1899 births
1969 deaths
Writers from Chicago
American film directors
20th-century American male writers